""Gopi Nath Tripura"" was a Tipra Indian politician from Tripura. He won the election as a Member of Legislative Assembly (MLA) representing Pabiachhara in 1972.

References

Members of the Tripura Legislative Assembly